Juan Carlos Ferrero was the defending champion but lost in the third round to Alberto Martín.

Gastón Gaudio won in the final 6–4, 6–0, 6–2 against Albert Costa.

Seeds
A champion seed is indicated in bold text while text in italics indicates the round in which that seed was eliminated. The top eight seeds received a bye to the second round.

  Lleyton Hewitt (semifinals)
  Yevgeny Kafelnikov (second round)
  Juan Carlos Ferrero (third round)
  Sébastien Grosjean (second round)
  Guillermo Cañas (semifinals)
  Younes El Aynaoui (quarterfinals)
  Àlex Corretja (quarterfinals)
  Thomas Enqvist (second round)
  Nicolás Lapentti (third round)
  Hicham Arazi (first round)
 n/a
  Carlos Moyá (third round)
  Albert Portas (first round)
  Juan Ignacio Chela (second round)
  Albert Costa (final)
  David Nalbandian (third round)

Draw

Finals

Top half

Section 1

Section 2

Bottom half

Section 3

Section 4

References
 2002 Open SEAT Godó Draw

Singles
2002 ATP Tour